Wanzl may refer to:

 Wanzl (Company), an industrial company based in Germany
 Wanzl rifle, a rifle used in World War I